1000s may refer to:
 The millennium  from 1 January 1000, to 31 December 1999, almost synonymous with the 2nd millennium (1001–2000)
 The century from 1 January 1000, to 31 December 1099, almost synonymous with the 11th century (1001–1100)
 1000s (decade), the decade from 1 January 1000, to 31 December 1009, almost synonymous with the 101st decade (1001–1010)

See also
 1000 (number)